Vijay Shivtare also Called as "Bapu" was a member of the 13th Maharashtra Legislative Assembly. He had represented the Purandar Assembly Constituency until 2019.He belongs to the Shiv Sena. In November, 2014, he was appointed party spokesman by the Shiv Sena. He was appointed Maharashtra's minister of state in December, 2014 he was given the water resources, water conservation portfolio. He was also given responsibility of being guardian minister of Satara district.

Positions held
 2009: Elected to Maharashtra Legislative Assembly (1st term)
 2014: Re-Elected to Maharashtra Legislative Assembly (2nd term)
 2014: Minister of State for Water Resources and Water Conservation in Maharashtra State Government
 2014: Guardian minister of Satara district

See also
 Devendra Fadnavis ministry

References

External links
 Official Website
 Vijay Shivtare twitter
 Shiv Sena Home Page
 http://www.rediff.com/news/report/fadnavis-ministry-expansion-sees-mix-of-old-and-new-faces/20141205.htm
 http://www.dnaindia.com/mumbai/report-maharashtra-cm-devendra-fadnavis-team-portfolios-allocated-bjp-retains-key-departments-2041510
 Profile of Maharashtra government ministers 

Maharashtra MLAs 2014–2019
Living people
Shiv Sena politicians
People from Pune district
Marathi politicians
1959 births